The International Hedgehog Registry is a registry for the hedgehog. It records the pedigrees of animals that have been registered, and makes the information available to scientists.

History
The registry was established in 1997, and acquired by the International Hedgehog Association in 2002.. The UK have their own registry.

References

External links

Hedgehogs in popular culture
Breed registries
Organizations established in 1997